Deranged (also known as Deranged: Confessions of a Necrophile) is a 1974 psychological horror film directed by Alan Ormsby and Jeff Gillen, and starring Roberts Blossom. Its plot, loosely based on the crimes of Ed Gein, follows Ezra Cobb, a middle-aged man in a rural Midwestern community who begins a string of serial murders and grave robberies after the death of his mother, a religious fanatic who raised him to be a misogynist. Though based on Gein, the film's title is misleading since Gein never experimented with necrophilia; although a necrophile is also defined as "an obsessive fascination with death and corpses."

Funded by an American concert promoter on a small budget, the production took place in Oshawa, Ontario in the winter of 1973, with a largely Canadian cast and crew. The film premiered in Los Angeles on March 20, 1974.

The film had disappeared since its release in 1974; however, it was rediscovered in Florida in the mid-90s and was released into home video by distributor America International Pictures’ parent company Metro Goldwyn Mayer.

Plot
Middle-aged Ezra Cobb helps operate a farm in the rural Midwest with his elderly mother, Amanda, a religious fanatic who has indoctrinated him since childhood to abhor women. Amanda dies following a protracted illness, and Ezra withdraws. Nearly a year after her death, he experiences auditory hallucinations that compel him to exhume his mother. He arrives at her grave one night and digs up her decomposed body, returning it to his home where he cobbles it together using discarded fish skin and wax.

Ezra becomes acquainted with Maureen Selby, an eccentric middle-aged woman and proclaimed psychic. One night during a preemptive sexual encounter, he murders her, an event that sets him off on a chain of serial killings. He first sets his attention on a 34-year-old waitress, Mary Ransum, whom he becomes acquainted with. He slashes her tires one night, leaving her stranded at the restaurant after-hours, and then appears under the guise of offering her a ride. She reluctantly agrees to ride with him to his house, where he says he has spare tires. After waiting in the truck for an extended period of time, Mary goes to look for him. In the house, she finds Ezra in a bedroom surrounded by the corpses of his mother and others, his face obscured with a mask made of human flesh. She attempts to flee, but he incapacitates her.

Later, Mary awakens bound in a closet, wearing only undergarments. Ezra escorts her to the dining room, where he seats her at a table surrounded by corpses. He becomes aroused and begins molesting her, during which she convinces him to free her arms. She manages to smash a bottle over his head, but he beats her to death with a human femur bone after she enrages him by flinging his mother's corpse at him, damaging it. A short time later, Ezra visits his friend, Harlon, at his house, where they discuss Mary's disappearance. In conversation, Ezra references her "being over at his place", a comment Harlon takes in jest. Harlon's teenage son, Brad, arrives with his girlfriend, Sally Mae, who immediately catches Ezra's interest. He later visits her while she works her cashier job at a local store, and shoots her with a rifle; the bullet grazes her head, but does not kill her.

Ezra places Sally Mae in the bed of his truck and drives away, but she awakens and escapes on foot, fleeing into the woods. She inadvertently runs over a bear trap earlier set by Harlon and Brad. The trap mangles her foot, and she attempts to hide amidst the underbrush, but Ezra finds her and shoots her to death. Harlon and Brad return to the store and find blood and broken glasses at the cash register, but no sign of Sally Mae; Brad recalls to the sheriff that Ezra was the last person he saw at the store.

Ezra brings Sally Mae's corpse to his farm, where he hangs it upside down in the barn and begins skinning the body. Harlon, Brad, and the sheriff arrive and find him in his kitchen, laughing over a bowl of blood. The picture freezes on this shot and a voice-over by Leslie Carlson states that "A few days later a group of townspeople, reportedly led by Harlan Kootz, under cover of night, burned the Cobb farm... to the ground.", the line getting progressively quieter until "ground" is barely audible.

Cast

Production

Filming
Principal photography took place over a period of two months between February and March 1973 in Oshawa, Ontario, Canada, on a budget of $200,000. Producer Tom Karr, who had been fascinated with Ed Gein for many years, funded the film himself with income he had earned as a concert promoter for Led Zeppelin and Three Dog Night. The Canadian location was chosen to ensure the film achieved a wintry setting. Locations used included an abandoned farmhouse, a local hardware store, and a basement location in the hotel in which the cast and crew were lodging. The majority of interior scenes were shot on sets constructed at a local motion picture studio.

The film's art director, Albert Fisher, dressed the sets with stacks of crime serials and pornographic magazines; Fisher garnered inspiration by reading newspaper stories about Ed Gein and his crimes.

Release

Censorship
In order to achieve an R-rating from the Motion Picture Association of America (MPAA), several sequences were truncated or excised entirely. Among these included an extended murder sequence involving Mary, as well as a protracted dissection sequence in which Ezra mutilates a corpse.

Theatrical release
Deranged had its theatrical premiere in Los Angeles, California on March 20, 1974 by American International Pictures.

Critical response

Time Out'''s review of the film was mostly positive, writing,  "The more sensationalist aspects of the story are admirably underplayed, and Blossom's nicely gauged performance lends the film surprising conviction." TV Guide awarded the film three out of five stars, praising Blossom's performance and calling it "an accurately recounted horror film inspired by the life of crazed Wisconsin farmer Ed Gein, who actually murdered, skinned and preserved body parts of dozens of women in the late 1950s... A sick little film but told with a disturbing sense of humor." Justin Remer from DVD Talk gave the film 4.5 out of 5 stars, writing, "Deranged is a cult classic that deserves a massively larger cult. Its performances are surprisingly vivid and realistic, its script is smart and subtly funny, its gore is stomach-churning, and its suspense scenes are genuinely nerve-jangling." Robert Vaughn from Diabolique Magazine praised the film for its dark sense of humor, creepy moments, and Blossom’s performance. Dennis Schwartz from Ozus’ World Movie Reviews rated the film a grade B+, calling it "scary and convincing", and commended the film's makeup effects, and Blossom's performance.

Donald Guarisco of AllMovie wrote: "Deranged is interesting because it as witty as it is scary. The film suffers from rough edges, the main problems being inconsistent pacing and a stilted framing device involving an investigative reporter, but remains compelling because it adds some perceptive social satire into the mix."

Home media
In 1994, to celebrate its 20th Anniversary, producer Tom Karr released the film on VHS through an independent distributor, Moore Video, based out of Virginia. Its success led to talks of a sequel with a script by Jason Paul Collum, Tim Ritter attached as a director and original star Roberts Blossom in talks to return. Ultimately with a lack of funding, it never materialized.

In 2002, Metro-Goldwyn-Mayer released Deranged as part of its "Midnite Movies" collection of double feature DVDs. It was released along with the 1980 feature film Motel Hell. A second release of the film was also made available in the United States on DVD from Desert Island Classics on March 5, 2014.

In 2007, Germany released a 30th Anniversary Collector's Edition. Where the U.S. DVD received a cut R-rating, the German version is unrated and uncut, with a brain-scooping scene which is cut from the U.S. version, it is also in 1.85:1 anamorphic widescreen, with both an English and German (dubbed) audio track and optional English and German subtitles.Deranged'' was released on Blu-ray format in the United Kingdom via Arrow Films on August 19, 2013, which contains both a Blu-ray and DVD of the film. The film was released on Blu-ray in the United States on July 7, 2015 by Kino Lorber distribution.

See also
 List of American films of 1974
 List of rediscovered films

References

External links
 
 
 
 

1974 films
1974 directorial debut films
1974 horror films
1974 independent films
1970s comedy horror films
1970s rediscovered films
1970s serial killer films
American comedy horror films
American independent films
American International Pictures films
American serial killer films
Canadian comedy horror films
Canadian independent films
Canadian serial killer films
Censored films
Crime horror films
Cultural depictions of Ed Gein
English-language Canadian films
Films about cannibalism
Films directed by Alan Ormsby
Films set in the United States
Films shot in Ontario
Grave-robbing in film
Horror films based on actual events
Necrophilia in film
Rediscovered American films
Rediscovered Canadian films
Self-censorship
1970s English-language films
1970s American films
1970s Canadian films